Leif Tommy Svensson (born 4 March 1945) is a Swedish former football manager and player. He is best known for playing for Östers IF and the Sweden national football team. He won the Guldbollen in 1969. He managed Sweden between 1991 and 1997 and led them to a bronze medal at the 1994 FIFA World Cup.

He is the son of Stig Svensson and the uncle of Joachim Björklund.

Early years
Tommy Svensson was born 4 March 1945 to father Stig Svensson. Stig was a footballer who played for Östers IF and dubbed Mr. Öster.

Svensson, like his father, had a natural talent for football. At just eleven years-old,
he debuted  for Östers youth team, and allegedly scored eight goals in the match. However, news paper headlines said he was too weak. Tommy bought a barbell and trained. Morning, noon and night, he lifted weights in order to bulk up.

Playing career
His playing career took him to Östers IF as well as Belgian Standard Liège. Throughout his career, he suffered from knee injuries. His injuries almost stopped him from competing in 1968. However, Svensson persevered. He was awarded Guldbollen in 1969 and played at the 1970 FIFA World Cup.

Managing career
After retiring, he started working as the Östers IF team manager while Lars "Laban" Arnesson was the coach. He later had a successful period with Tromsø IL, and became national team coach in 1991.

He led the Swedish team to the 1992 European Football Championship semi final as well as a bronze medal at the 1994 FIFA World Cup. He resigned in 1997 after failing to qualify for UEFA Euro 1996 and 1998 FIFA World Cup, and later worked in television with match commentary as well as coaching Tromsø for a second period in 2001.

Outside the Azteca Stadium, there is a statue of the best players of each nation was erected. Sweden's representative was Tommy Svensson.

Honours

Player 
Östers IF

 Allsvenskan: 1968

Individual

 Guldbollen: 1969
 Stor Grabb: 1969

Manager
Öster
Allsvenskan: 1978, 1980, 1981
Svenska Cupen: 1976–77
Sweden
FIFA World Cup: Third Place 1994

References

External links
Guldbollen 1969 (Aftonbladet.se) 
Player profile at Standard de Liège  

1945 births
Living people
Swedish footballers
Swedish expatriate footballers
Sweden international footballers
Östers IF players
Standard Liège players
1970 FIFA World Cup players
Swedish football managers
Östers IF managers
Sweden national football team managers
UEFA Euro 1992 managers
1994 FIFA World Cup managers
Swedish expatriate sportspeople in Belgium
Expatriate footballers in Belgium
Tromsø IL managers
Association football midfielders
Belgian Pro League players
Allsvenskan players
People from Växjö
Sportspeople from Kronoberg County